This is a list of episodes for the Philippine TV Series Lobo. The episodes were directed by Cathy Garcia-Molina, Jerry Lopez Sineneng and FM Reyes and produced by ABS-CBN.

Episode list

See also
Lobo
ABS-CBN

References

External links
 Angel Locsin Multiply Website
 Angel Locsin Multiply Group

Lists of Philippine drama television series episodes